Aurel Benović (born 14 July 2000) is a Croatian artistic gymnast.

In 2020, he won the silver medal in the floor event at the 2020 European Men's Artistic Gymnastics Championships held in Mersin, Turkey.

References

External links 
 

Living people
2000 births
Place of birth missing (living people)
Croatian male artistic gymnasts
21st-century Croatian people